Ivan Arnold Nestingen (September 9, 1921 – April 24, 1978) was Mayor of Madison, Wisconsin. He held the office from 1956 to 1961.

Born in Sparta, Wisconsin, Nestingen served in the United States Army during World War II. He received his bachelor's degree and law degrees from the University of Wisconsin–Madison and practiced law in Madison, Wisconsin. He served on the Madison Common Council 1951–1954. He served in the Wisconsin State Assembly as a Democrat from 1955 until April 16, 1956 when he resigned to become Mayor of Madison, Wisconsin. Nestingen served as Under Secretary of the United States Department of Health, Education and Welfare 1961–1965.

References

External links

|-

|-

People from Sparta, Wisconsin
University of Wisconsin–Madison alumni
University of Wisconsin Law School alumni
Wisconsin lawyers
Wisconsin city council members
Mayors of Madison, Wisconsin
1921 births
1978 deaths
20th-century American lawyers
20th-century American politicians
United States Army personnel of World War II
Democratic Party members of the Wisconsin State Assembly